"The Joker's Double Jeopardy!" is the story in the first issue of The Joker comic book series.

Plot 
A villain named Senor Alvarez breaks into Arkham Asylum and frees Two-Face from his cell. The Joker sees them and begs them to free him too. Senor Alvarez insults the Joker as "not a superior criminal" and escapes. Besmirched, the Joker orchestrates his own prison break.

Later, at his hotel room, Senor Alvarez tells Two-Face that he needs him to steal some Spanish doubloons with double faces. Two-Face decides to help Alvarez steal the doubloons after he flips his two-headed coin and the scarred side comes up.

Meanwhile, the Joker and one of his henchmen sneak into the room as the hotel room service (the henchman as the waiter and the Joker hiding in the tray). Once inside the room, the Joker hurls an acid-cream pie at Alvarez and his henchman, but Two-Face keeps the Joker at bay by hurling a bowl of pears at him. Finally, when the Joker picks himself up, he finds out that Two-Face is gone.

The Joker tracks Two-Face down and both villains engage in a tussle. Two-Face gains the upper-hand and ties the Joker to a sawing table. He tells the Joker that the saw will "cut him in two" and heads off for the doubloons. The wily Joker uses his acid-squirting flower to dissolve the ropes and escapes, preparing to ambush Two-Face.

Once Two-Face steals the doubloons, he heads back to the hideout, only to find the Joker waiting for him. The Joker keeps him at bay by hurling strands of fake-hair at him, but Two-Face grabs the Joker's coat. To Two-Face's surprise, the Joker's coat is treated with an adhesive and Two-Face cannot let go. The two villains roll on the floor, pounding one another until the Gotham City Police Department arrives. Commissioner Gordon reveals that the doubloons that Two-Face stole are counterfeit, as Alvarez had stolen the real ones prior to his confrontation with the Joker. He is now in custody.

See also 
The Joker (comic book)
Joker (character)

References

External links 
 The Joker's Double Jeopardy at DC Comics Database

Joker (character) titles
Single issue storylines of comic book series
DC Comics storylines